The 2016 U.S. F2000 National Championship was the seventh season – since its revival in 2010 – of the U.S. F2000 National Championship, an open wheel auto racing series that is the first step in INDYCAR's Road to Indy ladder, and is owned by Andersen Promotions. A 16-race schedule was announced on October 27, 2015.
The National class was re-introduced, for SCCA Formula Continental cars.

Australian Anthony Martin and his Cape Motorsports teammate Canadian Parker Thompson were neck and neck throughout the season. Ultimately Martin captured the championship on the back of seven wins compared to Thompson's four. Thompson finished on the podium in twelve of the sixteen races, one more than Martin. Brazilian Victor Franzoni won three races and was running at the finish of every race and finished third in points, fourteen points behind Thompson. Jordan Lloyd and Luo Yufeng also captured race victories.

Cape Motorsports won the team championship by a comfortable margin.

Eric Filgueiras won the National Class championship, largely unopposed.

2016 was the final year for the Van Diemen-designed Formula Continental derived cars in Championship Class. In 2017 it will be replaced by a new bespoke design from Tatuus. The old cars will remain eligible for National Class.

Drivers and teams

Race calendar and results

Championship standings

Drivers' Championship

Teams' Championship

References

External links 
 Official website

U.S. F2000 National Championship
U.S. F2000 National Championship